Events from the year 1830 in Russia

Incumbents
 Monarch – Nicholas I

Events

 The November Uprising (November Insurrection) 
 Battle of Khunzakh
 Cholera Riots
 Sevastopol plague uprising

Births

Deaths

References

1830 in Russia
Years of the 19th century in the Russian Empire